The 25th Pennsylvania House of Representatives District is in southwestern Pennsylvania and has been represented by Brandon Markosek since 2019.

District profile 
The 25th District is located in Allegheny County and includes the following area:

 East McKeesport
 Monroeville
 North Versailles Township
 Pitcairn
 Plum (part)
District 04 
District 05 
District 06 
District 08 
District 09 
District 10 
District 11 
District 12 
District 13 
District 14 
District 15 
District 16
 Trafford (Allegheny County Portion)
Turtle Creek
 Wall
 Wilmerding

Representatives

Recent election results

References

External links 
 District map from the United States Census Bureau
 Pennsylvania House Legislative District Maps from the Pennsylvania Redistricting Commission.
 Population Data for District 25 from the Pennsylvania Redistricting Commission.

Government of Allegheny County, Pennsylvania
25